Sir Robert Shaw, 1st Baronet (29 January 1774 – 10 March 1849) of Bushy Park, Dublin was a Tory UK Member of Parliament who represented Dublin City from 1804 to 1826.

Sir Robert's great-great-grandfather, William Shaw, had gone to Ireland and fought for King William at the Battle of the Boyne in 1689, and was rewarded by the grant of land there. William's great-grandson, Robert Shaw sr., moved to Dublin in the mid-18th century, prospered as a merchant and became Accountant General of the Post Office. His eldest son, Robert, was born in 1774.

On 7 January 1796 Robert junior married Maria, daughter and heiress of Abraham Wilkinson, and as a dowry received £10,000 together with a  estate, Bushy Park (possibly named after Bushy Park in Teddington) which adjoined Terenure House. Six months later he succeeded his father to the Terenure estate, which he sold in 1806, establishing Bushy Park House as the family seat (which was then occupied by members of the Shaw family until 1951).

In 1796 he became a Dublin Sheriff's peer, a position he held until 1808, and was appointed High Sheriff of County Dublin for 1806–07. He was an alderman of Dublin from 1808 to 1841 and was elected Lord Mayor of Dublin for 1815–16.

Between 1799 and 1800, Shaw served in the Irish House of Commons for Bannow. After the Acts of Union Shaw replaced the former Tory MP John Claudius Beresford as an MP for Dublin City in the Parliament of the United Kingdom in a by-election on 31 March 1804. Shaw retained the seat until he retired, at the dissolution of Parliament in 1826. He was created a baronet (i.e. becoming Sir Robert) on 17 August 1821, being formally invested by George IV when he visited Ireland in 1822.

Maria died in 1831 having borne nine children, including 6 sons, of whom only 3 outlived their father. Their surviving daughter Charlotte married Sir William MacMahon, 1st Baronet, Master of the Rolls in Ireland and had eight children. Sir Robert's cousin, Bernard Shaw, had died in 1826 and Sir Robert had provided Bernard's widow, Frances, with a cottage on the Terenure estate where she lived for the next 45 years. One of Frances' grandchildren, George Bernard Shaw, was to be a regular visitor. On several occasions, Sir Robert proposed to Frances, but he was turned down each time

In July 1834 he married Amelia Spencer at Twickenham Parish Church. The couple kept a home in Twickenham, and were closely involved in the formation of the Twickenham Independent (Congregational) chapel. Sir Robert died on 10 March 1849 at Bushy Park, Dublin and was succeeded by his eldest son Sir Robert Shaw, 2nd Baronet, and then by his younger son Sir Frederick Shaw, 3rd Baronet.

References

Parliamentary Election Results in Ireland, 1801–1922, edited by B.M. Walker (Royal Irish Academy 1978)
The Parliaments of England by Henry Stooks Smith (1st edition published in three volumes 1844–50), 2nd edition edited (in one volume) by F.W.S. Craig (Political Reference Publications 1973)
Twickenham United Reformed Church: Our founder

External links 
 

|-

1774 births
1849 deaths
People from Templeogue
Baronets in the Baronetage of the United Kingdom
Lord Mayors of Dublin
Irish MPs 1798–1800
Members of the Parliament of Ireland (pre-1801) for County Wexford constituencies
Members of the Parliament of the United Kingdom for County Dublin constituencies (1801–1922)
Tory MPs (pre-1834)
UK MPs 1802–1806
UK MPs 1806–1807
UK MPs 1807–1812
UK MPs 1812–1818
UK MPs 1818–1820
UK MPs 1820–1826
High Sheriffs of County Dublin